MTV Sports is a show that ran on MTV from 1992 to 1997. Dan Cortese hosted the reality sports show featuring radical sports from around the country. It was later hosted by athlete/model Gabrielle Reece from 1993 to 1995.

Episode list
 List of Episodes

Notable guests
 Dean Cain
 Rich Hopkins
 Scott Stokely

Awards and nominations

References

MTV original programming
1992 American television series debuts
1997 American television series endings